Lourdes is a municipality (município) in the state of São Paulo in Brazil. The population is 2,300 (2020 est.) in an area of 114 km². The elevation is 403 m.

References

Municipalities in São Paulo (state)